Kollur Kala is a 1991 Indian Kannada-language action film, directed by Om Sai Prakash. The story was penned by Thirunavukkarasu. The film stars Shashikumar and Malashri, with Vidyashri playing a key supporting role.

The film's music was composed by Upendra Kumar and the audio was launched on the Lahari Music banner. The film was a remake of the Tamil film Maruthu Pandi (1990).

Cast 
 Shashikumar
 Malashri 
 Vidyashri
 Doddanna
 Umashri
 Abhinaya
 Rajeev
 Mukhyamantri Chandru
 Sihi Kahi Chandru
 M. S. Umesh
 Mysore Lokesh
 Mandeep Roy
 Aravind
 Devikarani

Soundtrack 
The music of the film was composed by Upendra Kumar and the lyrics were written by R. N. Jayagopal.

References 

1991 films
1990s Kannada-language films
Indian action films
Films scored by Upendra Kumar
Kannada remakes of Tamil films
Films directed by Sai Prakash
1991 action films